= Victorian gothic =

Victorian gothic may refer to:

- Gothic fiction, a type of fiction writing that began in the Romantic period
- Gothic Revival architecture, a type of architecture based on a medieval style revived in the Romantic period
